The 1872 United States presidential election in Connecticut took place on November 5, 1872. All contemporary 37 states were part of the 1872 United States presidential election. The state voters chose six electors to the Electoral College, which selected the president and vice president.

Connecticut was won by the Republican nominees, incumbent President Ulysses S. Grant of Illinois and his running mate Senator Henry Wilson of Massachusetts. Grant and Wilson defeated the Liberal Republican and Democratic nominees, former Congressman Horace Greeley of New York and his running mate former Senator and Governor Benjamin Gratz Brown of Missouri by a narrow margin of 4.82%.

Results

Results by county

See also
 United States presidential elections in Connecticut

References

Connecticut
1872
1872 Connecticut elections